Thereus pedusa is a species of butterfly of the family Lycaenidae. It is found in Brazil (Amazon) and the Guianas.

References

Butterflies described in 1867
Thereus
Lycaenidae of South America
Taxa named by William Chapman Hewitson